Nüshu is a syllabic script derived from Chinese characters that was used exclusively among women in Jiangyong County in Hunan province of southern China.

Features
Unlike standard written Chinese, which is logographic (each character represents a word or part of a word), Nüshu is phonetic, with each of its approximately 600–700 characters representing a syllable. This is about half the number required to represent all the syllables in Tuhua, as tonal distinctions are frequently ignored, making it "the most revolutionary and thorough simplification of Chinese characters ever attempted". Zhou Shuoyi, described as the only male to have mastered the script, compiled a dictionary listing 1,800 variant characters and allographs.

It has been suggested that Nüshu characters appear to be italic variant forms of Kaishu Chinese characters, as can be seen in the name of the script, though some have been substantially modified to better fit embroidery patterns. The strokes of the characters are in the form of dots, horizontals, virgules, and arcs. The script is traditionally written in vertical columns running from right to left, but in modern contexts it may be written in horizontal lines from left to right, just like modern-day Chinese. Unlike in standard Chinese, writing Nüshu script with very fine, almost threadlike, lines is seen as a mark of fine penmanship.

About half of Nüshu is modified Chinese characters used logographically. In about 100, the entire character is adopted with little change apart from skewing the frame from square to rhomboid, sometimes reversing them (mirror image), and often reducing the number of strokes. Another hundred have been modified in their strokes, but are still easily recognizable, as is nü 'woman' above. About 200 have been greatly modified, but traces of the original Chinese character are still discernible.

The rest of the characters are phonetic. They are either modified characters, as above, or elements extracted from characters. There are used for 130 phonetic values, each used to write on average ten homophonous or nearly homophonous words, though there are allographs as well; women differed on which Chinese character they preferred for a particular phonetic value.

History 

Before 1949, Jiangyong County operated under an agrarian economy and women had to abide by patriarchal Confucian practices such as the Three Obediences. Women were confined to the home (through foot binding) and were assigned roles in housework and needlework instead of fieldwork, which allowed the practice of Nüshu to develop. Specifically, unmarried women, also known as "upstairs girls," oftentimes gathered in groups in upstairs chambers to embroider and sing. The practice of singing Nüge (women's song) allowed young women to learn Nüshu.

It is not known when Nüshu came into being. The difficulty in dating Nüshu is due to local customs of burning or burying Nüshu texts with their owners and the difficulty in textiles and paper surviving in humid environments. However, many of the simplifications found in Nüshu had been in informal use in standard Chinese since the Song and Yuan dynasty (13th–14th century). It seems to have reached its peak during the latter part of the Qing dynasty (1644–1911).

Though a local educated worker at the Jiangyong Cultural Office (Zhou Shuoyi) had collected, studied and translated many Nüshu texts into standard Chinese, he was unable to draw outside attention to the script until a report was submitted to the central government on this subject in 1983.

During the latter part of the 20th century, owing more to wider social, cultural and political changes than the narrow fact of greater access to hanzi literacy, younger girls and women stopped learning Nüshu, and it began falling into disuse, as older users died. The script was suppressed by the Japanese during their invasion of China in the 1930s-40s, because they feared that the Chinese could use it to send secret messages., and also during China's Cultural Revolution (1966–76). The last original writers of the script died in the 1990s (the last one in 2004).

It is no longer customary for women to learn Nüshu, and literacy in Nüshu is now limited to a few scholars who learned it from the last women who were literate in it. However, after Yang Yueqing made a documentary about Nüshu, the government of the People's Republic of China started to popularize the effort to preserve the increasingly endangered script, and some younger women are beginning to learn it.

Recent years 

Yang Huanyi, an inhabitant of Jiangyong county, Hunan province and the last person proficient in this writing system, died on September 20, 2004, age 98.

To preserve Nüshu as a UNESCO intangible cultural heritage, a Nüshu museum was established in 2002 and "Nüshu transmitters" were created in 2003.

The language and locale have attracted foreign investment building up infrastructure at possible tourist sites and a $209,000 grant from the Ford Foundation to build a Nüshu museum scheduled to open in 2007. However, with the line of transmission now broken, there are fears that the features of the script are being distorted by the effort of marketing it for the tourist industry.

The title of a Nüshu transmitter is given to someone who is proficient in Nüshu writing and singing and needlework, knowledgeable on local customs, practices civil virtues, and loyal to the Center for Nüshu Cultural and Research Administration. They are paid a monthly stipend of 100 RMB (as of 2010) in exchange for creating Nüshu works for the government and providing free copies of Nüshu works to local authorities. While recent academic interest in Nüshu has allowed for efforts in its preservation, it comes with the loss of women's agency over the presentation of their Nüshu works and their inability to directly control who the audience is.

Chinese composer Tan Dun has created a multimedia symphony entitled "Nu Shu: The Secret Songs of Women" for Harp, Orchestra, and 13 microfilms. Tan Dun spent 5 years conducting field research in Hunan Province, documenting on film the various songs the women use to communicate. Those songs become a 3rd dimension to his symphony, and are projected alongside the orchestra and harp soloist.

Lisa See describes the use of Nüshu among 19th-century women in Snow Flower and the Secret Fan.

Since Nüshu was oftentimes practiced in the private sphere, patriarchal ideas prevented it from being acknowledged in the public domain. These ideas deemed Nüshu irrelevant in the public world due to its perceived importance only being relevant in personal contexts while also asserting that culture in the public sphere was dominated by men. Contemporary artists have attempted to commemorate Nüshu through its "translation." Yuen-yi Lo, a Hong Kong/Macau artist, uses drawings as a way to critique the modern separation between writing and drawing and translate the cultural practice of Nüshu into a visual art practice by and for women. Hong Kong based choreographer Helen Lai uses dance as a medium to critique the patriarchal media representation of Nüshu. She suggests that Nüshu is an innovative art form despite the media portrayal of it being a "secret."

Adoption 

The Nüshu script is used to write a distinct local Chinese variety known as Xiangnan Tuhua that is spoken by the people of the Xiao River and Yongming River region of northern Jiangyong County, Hunan. This dialect, which differs enough from those of other parts of Hunan that there is little mutual intelligibility, is known to its speakers as  "Dong language". It is written only in the Nüshu script. There are differing opinions on the classification of Xiangnan Tuhua, as it has features of several different Chinese varieties. Some scholars classify it under Xiang Chinese or Pinghua and other scholars consider it a hybrid dialect. In addition to speaking Tuhua, most local people in Jiangyong are bilingual in the Hunan dialect of Southwestern Mandarin, which they use for communication with people from outside the area where Tuhua is spoken, as well as for some formal occasions. If Hunan Southwestern Mandarin is written, then it is always written using standard Chinese characters and not with the Nüshu script.

Jiangyong County has a mixed population of Han Chinese and Yao people, but Nüshu is used only to write the local Chinese dialect (Xiangnan Tuhua), and there are no known examples of the script being used to write the local Yao language.

Works 

Nüshu works were a way for women to lament by communicating sorrows and establishing connections with an empathetic community.

A large number of the Nüshu works were "third day missives". They were cloth bound booklets created by laotong, "sworn sisters" and mothers and given to their counterpart "sworn sisters" or daughters upon their marriage. They wrote down songs in Nüshu, which were delivered on the third day after the young woman's marriage. This way, they expressed their hopes for the happiness of the young woman who had left the village to be married and their sorrow for being parted from her.

Other works, including poems and lyrics, were handwoven into belts and straps, or embroidered onto everyday items and clothing. Other types of Nüshu works included ballads, autobiographies, biographies, and prayers.

In Unicode

Nüshu is included in the Unicode Standard under the name "Nushu" (because Unicode character names, block names, and script names can only use ASCII letters). 396 Nüshu letters were added to the Nushu block as part of Unicode version 10.0, which was released in June 2017. An iteration mark for Nüshu, is in the Ideographic Symbols and Punctuation block.

The Unicode block for Nüshu is U+1B170–U+1B2FF:

See also 

 Hiragana
 Láadan
 Language and gender ("genderlect")
 Origin of hangul

Notes

References 

 
 
 Van Esch (2017). Nǚshū (Women's script). In Rint Sybesma, Wolfgang Behr, Yueguo Gu, Zev Handel, C.-T. James Huang & James Myers (eds.), Encyclopedia of Chinese language and linguistics, vol. III, 262–267. Leiden: Brill.
 Wilt L. Idema. Heroines of Jiangyong: Chinese Narrative Ballads in Women's Script. (Seattle: University of Washington Press,  2009).

External links 
 Online Nushu Dictionary (Chinese), (English).
 Nüshu texts (in Chinese)
 Details of Nüshu at Omniglot.com
 The secrets of nu-shu, article by Lisa See
 Nüshu dictionary
 The Nushu Coder’s Group on GitHub, gathering numerous Nüshu resources.
 Women's writing: dead or alive? Language Log postings by Victor H. Mair.

Jiangyong
Languages of China
Syllabary writing systems
Writing systems derived from the Chinese
Gender in language
Culture in Hunan
Women's culture
Women in China